Carnifex Ferry Battlefield State Park is an American Civil War battle site that commemorates the Battle of Carnifex Ferry. It is located on the rim of the Gauley River Canyon near Summersville, a town in Nicholas County, West Virginia. The  park features Patterson House Museum, three views of the Gauley River, hiking trails and picnic facilities. It is one of the oldest state parks in the United States. A Civil War re-enactment takes place on a weekend after Labor Day.  As Carnifex Ferry State Park, it was listed on the National Register of Historic Places in 1974.

Accessibility
Accessibility for the disabled was assessed by West Virginia University. The assessment found the picnic shelters and concession stand to be accessible. The 2005 assessment identified issues with parking lot signage, slippery sidewalks, and insufficient handrails.

See also

List of West Virginia state parks
State park
Summersville Dam
Summersville Lake

References

External links

Information on the Patterson House Museum

Protected areas of Nicholas County, West Virginia
State parks of West Virginia
West Virginia in the American Civil War
Battlefields of the Eastern Theater of the American Civil War
Historic house museums in West Virginia
Protected areas established in 1935
Museums in Nicholas County, West Virginia
American Civil War museums in West Virginia
Parks on the National Register of Historic Places in West Virginia
National Register of Historic Places in Nicholas County, West Virginia
Historic districts in Nicholas County, West Virginia
Conflict sites on the National Register of Historic Places in West Virginia